Tom Ross (born January 17, 1954) is an American former professional ice hockey centre.

Early life 
Ross was born in Detroit, Michigan. Prior to turning professional, he played four years (1972–76) of NCAA hockey with Michigan State University. He is the all-time leader in career points at the Division I level with 324 points in 115 games played.

Career 
As a professional, Ross played 216 games in the IHL with the Port Huron Flags (1976–77) and the Kalamazoo Wings (1977–80). He also played one game in the CHL with the Kansas City Red Wings, and three games in the AHL with the Adirondack Red Wings.

Awards and honors

References

External links

1954 births
Adirondack Red Wings players
AHCA Division I men's ice hockey All-Americans
American men's ice hockey centers
Ice hockey people from Detroit
Kalamazoo Wings (1974–2000) players
Kansas City Red Wings players
Living people
Michigan State Spartans men's ice hockey players
Port Huron Flags players